The Americas Zone was one of the three zones of the regional Davis Cup competition in 1988.

In the Americas Zone there were two different tiers, called groups, in which teams competed against each other to advance to the upper tier.

Group I
The winner of Group I was promoted to the following year's World Group. Teams who lost their respective first-round ties competed in the relegation play-off, with the winning team remaining in Group I, whereas the losing team was relegated to the Americas Zone Group II in 1989.

Participating nations

Draw

  are promoted to the World Group in 1989.

  are relegated to Group II in 1989.

First round

Ecuador vs. Canada

Chile vs. Peru

Second round

Ecuador vs. Argentina

Peru vs. United States

Relegation play-offs

Canada vs. Chile

Third round

Argentina vs. United States

Group II
The winner in Group II advanced to the Americas Zone Group I in 1989.

Participating nations

Draw

  are promoted to Group I in 1989.

First round

Cuba vs. Bolivia

Venezuela vs. Colombia

Jamaica vs. Haiti

Second round

Cuba vs. Uruguay

Jamaica vs. Venezuela

Third round

Uruguay vs. Venezuela

References

External links
Davis Cup official website

Davis Cup Americas Zone
Americas Zone